The 2019–20 FC Midtjylland season was FC Midtjylland's 21st season of existence, and their 19th consecutive season in the Superliga, the top tier of football in Denmark. As a result of the club's first ever Danish Cup win the previous season, it competed in the 2019–20 UEFA Europa League and had the opportunity to defending its cup title in the 2019–20 Danish Cup, but lost in the Third Round. The season was interrupted by the COVID-19 pandemic, and matches were stopped after matches on March 8 and resumed on June 1.  

The club captured its third-ever Danish Superliga title, clinching the championship on 9 July 2020, with a decisive 3-1 over 2018-19 Champion F.C. København.

Squad

Transfers and loans 
From July 1, 2019.  Arrivals include players returning from loans.  Departures include players out on loan.

Arrivals

Summer

Winter

Departures

Summer

Winter

Non-competitive

Pre-season Friendlies

Competitive

Competition record

Danish Superliga

Regular season

Championship Round

Matches

Danish Cup

Danish Cup Matches

UEFA Europa League

Third qualifying round

Statistics

Appearances 

Includes all competitive matches.

Goalscorers 

This includes all competitive matches.

Assists 

This includes all competitive matches.

Clean Sheets 

This includes all competitive matches.

Disciplinary record 

This includes all competitive matches.

Awards

Individual

References

External links 
 FC Midtjylland  in Danish

FC Midtjylland seasons
Danish football clubs 2019–20 season
Midtjylland